"Switch" is a single by the English electronic music band Fluke. It is the band's last official single using the alias Fluke to date although it has been followed by the white label vinyl release Bullet 2005 which does not appear to be an official "on-label" release by the band.

"Switch" was featured on the Need For Speed Underground 2 soundtrack.

Versions

2003 singles
Fluke (band) songs
2003 songs
One Little Indian Records singles